Romerus ocellatus (common names ocellated bubble-nest frog and ocellated small treefrog) is a species of frog in the family Rhacophoridae. It is endemic to the Hainan Island, China.

Romerus ocellatus inhabits rainforests and bamboo forests of southern Hainan. It breeds in rain-filled bamboo stems by larval development. As it has not been recorded outside forest, it is vulnerable to habitat loss due to infrastructure development for tourism and logging.

References

ocellatus
Amphibians of China
Endemic fauna of Hainan
Taxonomy articles created by Polbot
Amphibians described in 1973